The 485th Bombardment Squadron is an inactive United States Air Force unit.  It was last assigned to the 505th Bombardment Group.  It was inactivated at Northwest Field, Guam on 10 June 1946.

History
Activated in August 1917 as an Air Service Aero Squadron during World War I.   Was apparently a non-flying support squadron, deployed to France in early 1918 and supported Air Service operations on the Western Front.  Remained in France after the Armistice, returning to New York City, demobilizing in May 1919.

Reactivated as part of the Army reserve forces in 1924, assigned to Wright or Patterson Field at Dayton Ohio.  Although designated as a bombardment squadron, it is unclear if the unit had any aircraft assigned to it.  Disbanded in 1942.

Reconstituted in 1944 as a B-29 Superfortress Very Heavy bombardment squadron; assigned to Second Air Force for training.   Initially assigned to 505th Bombardment Group, however shortages in aircraft and equipment led to personnel being consolidated into other group squadrons; inactivated.  Reactivated about a month later; assigned to 501st Bombardment Group and equipped with B-29B limited production aircraft.

After completion of training deployed to Central Pacific Area (CPA), assigned to XXI Bomber Command, Northwest Field (Guam) for operational missions.  B-29Bs were standard production aircraft stripped of most defensive guns to increase speed and bomb load, The tail gun was aimed and fired automatically by the new AN/APG-15B radar fire control system that detected the approaching enemy plane and made all the necessary calculations.

Mission of the squadron was the strategic bombardment of the Japanese Home Islands.  Dntered combat on 16 June 1945 with a bombing raid against an airfield on Moen. Flew first mission against the Japanese home islands on 26 June 1945 and afterwards operated principally against the enemy's petroleum industry.  Flew primarily low-level, fast attacks at night using a mixture of high-explosive and incendiary bombs to attack targets.

Flew last combat mission on 15 August 1945, later flew in "Show of Force" mission on 2 September 1945 over Tokyo Bay during formal Japanese Surrender. Inactivated on Guam 15 April 1946, personnel returned to the United States and aircraft sent to storage in Southwest United States.

Operations and decorations
 Combat Operations: Constructed and maintained facilities (in Zone of Advance after Sep 1918), Mar-c. Dec 1918. Combat in Western Pacific, 23 Jun-14 Aug 1945.
 Campaigns: Air Offensive; Japan; Eastern Mandates; Western Pacific.
 Decorations: Distinguished Unit Citation, Japan 6–13 Jul 1945

Lineage
 Organized as 73d Aero Squadron on 14 August 1917
 Redesignated 485th Aero Squadron on 1 February 1918.
 Demobilized on 20 May 1919
 Reconstituted and consolidated (1936) with 485th Bombardment Squadron which was constituted and allotted to the reserve on 31 March 1924
 Activated, date unknown (personnel assigned, Sep 1925)
 Disbanded on 31 May 1942
 Reconstituted and consolidated (21 April 1944) with 485th Bombardment Squadron (Very Heavy) which was constituted on 28 February 1944
 Activated on 11 March 1944.
 Inactivated on 10 May 1944
 Activated on 1 June 1944
 Inactivated on 10 June 1946

Assignments
 Unknown, 14 August 1917 – Mar 1918
 Air Service Production Center No. 2, Mar 1918
 Air Service Spares Depot, Sep 1918 – Jan 1919
 Unknown, Jan-20 May 1919
 Fifth Corps Area, 1925(?)-31 May 1942
 505th Bombardment Group, 11 Mar-10 May 1944
 501st Bombardment Group, 1 Jun 1944 – 10 Jun 1946

Stations

 Kelly Field, Texas, 14 August 1917
 Camp Morrison, Virginia, 21 Dec 1917 – 4 Mar 1918
 Romorantin, France, 25 March 1918
 Detachment operated from St Nazaire to 3 April 1918
 Unit operated from Gievres, 17 May-9 Jun 1918
 Detachment operated from Chatenay-sur-Seine from 11 September 1918
 Chatenay-sur-Seine, France, 21 September 1918
 Bordeaux, France, c. 1 Feb 1919-unknown

 Mitchel Field, New York, c. 2–20 May 1919
 Dayton, Ohio 1925? -31 May 1942?
 Dalhart Army Air Field, Texas, 11 March 1944
 Harvard Army Airfield, Nebraska, 12 Mar-10 May 1944
 Dalhart Army Air Field, Texas, 1 June 1944
 Harvard Army Airfield, Nebraska, 23 Aug 194 – 7 Mar 1945
 Northwest Field, Guam, 14 Apr 1945 – 10 Jun 1946

Aircraft
 Unknown (if any) prior to 1944
 B-29 Superfortress, 1944–1946

References

 Maurer, Maurer (1983). Air Force Combat Units of World War II. Maxwell AFB, Alabama: Office of Air Force History. .

Strategic bombing squadrons of the United States Army Air Forces